A marshmallow is a confection typically made from sugar, water and gelatin.

Marshmallow may also refer to:

Arts, entertainment, and media

Fictional entities
Marshmallow (book), a 1942 picture book about a pet rabbit of the same name, by Clare Turlay Newberry
Marshmallow (Annoying Orange), a main character from the online series  The Annoying Orange
Marshmallow, a fictional character from the 2013 Disney animated film, Frozen

Music

Groups and labels
Marshmallow (band), a band from London, England
Marshmallow Records, a Japanese independent jazz record label founded in 1978
Marshmello, an American DJ

Works
Marshmallows (album) (1996), an album by The For Carnation
"Marshmallow", a song by IU from the album IU...IM

Foods
Marshmallow creme or "fluff," a spreadable marshmallow-like substance

Other uses
 Android Marshmallow, version 6.0 of Google's operating system for mobile devices
Althaea officinalis, a plant known as the "marshmallow", from which the confection was originally made
Basketball Arena (London), venue of the 2012 Summer Olympics, colloquially known as the Marshmallow